Unmanned aerial vehicles (UAVs), or drones, have frequently been involved in military operations. Non-military UAVs have often been reported as causing hazards to aircraft, or to people or property on the ground. Safety concerns have been raised due to the potential for an ingested drone to rapidly disable an aircraft engine, and several near-misses and verified collisions have involved hobbyist drone operators flying in violation of aviation safety regulations.

Historical events involving UAVs
1981 The Israeli IAI Scout drone was operated in combat missions by the South African Defence Force against Angola during Operation Protea.
1982 UAVs operated by the Israeli Air Force are instrumental during Operation Mole Cricket 19, where both IAI Scout and Tadiran Mastiff are used to identity SAM sites, while Samson decoy UAVs are used to activate and confuse Syrian radar.
October 2002 a few days before the U.S. Senate vote on the Authorization for Use of Military Force Against Iraq Resolution, about 75 senators were told in closed session that Saddam Hussein had the means of delivering biological and chemical weapons of mass destruction by UAVs that could be launched from ships off the Atlantic coast to attack U.S. eastern seaboard cities. Colin Powell suggested in his presentation to the United Nations that they had been transported out of Iraq and could be launched against the U.S. It was later revealed that Iraq's UAV fleet consisted of only a few outdated Czech training drones. At the time, there was a vigorous dispute within the intelligence community as to whether CIA's conclusions about Iraqi UAVs were accurate. The U.S. Air Force, the agency most familiar with UAVs, denied outright that Iraq possessed any offensive UAV capability.
3 November 2002The first US targeted UAV killing outside the conventional battlefield took place in the Marib district of Yemen. Six alleged terrorists were killed in their SUV by a UAV-fired missile. The command centre was in Tampa, Florida, USA.
December 2002 The first ever dogfight involving a UAV occurred when an Iraqi MiG-25 and a U.S. RQ-1 Predator fired missiles at each other. The MiG's missile destroyed the Predator.
September 2011The U.S. deployed UAVs in Yemen to search for and kill Anwar al-Awlaki, an American and Yemeni imam, firing at and failing to kill him at least once before he was killed in a UAV-launched missile attack in Yemen on 30 September 2011. The targeted killing of an American citizen was unprecedented. However, nearly nine years earlier in 2002, U.S. citizen Kemal Darwish was one of six men killed by the first UAV strike outside a war zone, in Yemen.
December 2011Iran captured a United States' RQ-170 unmanned aerial vehicle that flew over Iran and rejected President Barack Obama's request to return it to the US. Iranian officials claim to have recovered data from the U.S. surveillance aircraft. However, it is not clear how Iran brought it down.  There have also been claims that Iran spoofed the GPS signal used by the UAV and hijacked it into landing on an Iranian runway.

Verified aircraft collisions

21 September 2017 A civilian UAV collided with a Black Hawk helicopter in the evening over the eastern shore of Staten Island, New York City, United States. The helicopter was one of two with the 82nd Airborne Division flying out of Fort Bragg on duty for the United Nations General Assembly. The helicopters were able to continue flying and landed at Linden Airport. Nobody was hurt, but part of the UAV was found at the bottom of the main rotor system.

In December 2017 the National Transportation Safety Board issued an accident report into the collision, finding the pilot of the UAV at fault. The UAV operator deliberately flew the UAV 2.5 miles away from himself and was unaware of the helicopters' presence. The operator did not know of the collision until contacted by the NTSB and when interviewed by them showed only a general cursory awareness of the regulations. There was also a temporary flight restriction in place, which allowed the Black Hawk but not the UAV. UAVs are prohibited from flying beyond line of sight under FAA regulations.

12 October 2017 A Beech King Air A100 of Skyjet Aviation collided with a UAV as the former was approaching Jean Lesage Airport near Quebec City, Canada. The aircraft landed safely despite being hit on the wing. The aircraft had flown from Rouyn-Noranda Airport to Rouyn-Noranda Airport with six passengers and two crew. A spokeswoman for Quebec City Police said that neither the UAV or operator had been found. It had been flying at 1500 feet – five times the maximum altitude that UAVs are permitted to fly in Canada. Regulations banning flying of UAVs near airports had been introduced earlier in 2017. Minister of Transport Marc Garneau released a statement saying "Although the vast majority of drone operators fly responsibly, it was our concern for incidents like this that prompted me to take action and issue interim safety measures restricting where recreational drones could be flown. I would like to remind drone operators that endangering the safety of an aircraft is extremely dangerous and a serious offence."

10 August 2018 A hot air balloon carrying a certified pilot and two passengers was struck by a drone while flying near the Teton County Fairgrounds in Driggs, Idaho, United States. The drone fell to earth and was destroyed after its rotors were sheared off by contact with the balloon's envelope and load lines; the balloon suffered no significant damage and landed safely with no injuries to the pilot or passengers. The inexperienced hobbyist drone operator reportedly lost sight of the balloon in the aircraft's monitor and was operating within 5 mi (8 km) of Driggs–Reed Memorial Airport without notifying air traffic control, a violation of Federal Aviation Regulations; the balloon pilot had relied on radio communication with nearby manned aircraft and air traffic control to avoid other air traffic. The balloon pilot chose to report the incident to the National Transportation Safety Board in lieu of notifying the local sheriff's department, stating that she hoped "this incident helps create a conversation of respect for nature, the airspace, and rules and regulations." The incident is currently under investigation. This is the first-ever recorded mid-air collision between a UAV and a hot air balloon.

 10 August 2021 A Cessna 172 of Canadian Flyers International Inc. registered as C-GKWL collided with a drone operated by the York Regional Police while on approach to Buttonville Municipal Airport. The Cessna landed without incident and suffered major damage, including a bent airbox, a damaged engine cowling and a propeller strike.

Alleged aircraft collisions
17 April 2016 The pilot of British Airways flight BA727 reported a collision with a UAV to Metropolitan Police. The Airbus A320 was approaching Heathrow Airport when the collision happened. None of the 132 passengers or 5 crew were injured. After an inspection by engineers, the aircraft was cleared to take off for its next flight.

Members of the British government as well as the Labour Party and BALPA called for urgent action, including a register of drone users and geo-fencing of airports.

In late April 2016 Transport Secretary Patrick McLoughlin told MPs that experts believed that the incident was not related to UAVs. There was no damage to the aircraft and it wasn't clear if it was a plastic bag rather than a UAV. An investigation by the Air Accidents Investigation Branch had been closed due to lack of evidence. Police had searched a "wide area" of Richmond and found nothing.

13 December 2018 The crew of an Aeroméxico Boeing 737-800 operating as Flight 773 heard a "pretty loud bang" on approach to Tijuana International Airport, and after a safe landing, the nose of the aircraft was found to be damaged. The airline has not positively determined the cause, but the incident is being investigated as a drone strike.

Aircraft near-miss incidents

Austria
August 2016 A rescue helicopter carrying a car crash victim to Klagenfurt hospital had to take evasive action when a UAV flew within metres of it. Local police were unable to determine who was operating it.

Canada
March 2014A remote-controlled helicopter was reported by the crew of a Boeing 777 flying 30 metres from their craft at Vancouver International Airport.

April 2014Video taken from a camera on board a UAV showed the UAV flying close to an airliner as it landed at the same airport.  A Transport Canada spokesman said his department and the RCMP were investigating.

July 2016Edmonton police helicopter Air 1 was responding to a call downtown when the pilot saw a white quadcopter with red lights approaching. A flight crew member said that a collision "could have been catastrophic and potentially fatal for both crew members of Air 1". Transport Canada had been made aware of the incident and Edmonton Police Service said there was a criminal investigation into the events as well as possible charges under the Aeronautics Act.

China
In January 2017 a 23 year old UAV operator from Xiaoshan was detained because of footage taken from a drone flying near airliners descending to land at Hangzhou Xiaoshan International Airport. The incident came to light when footage was uploaded to QQ. This was an eight-second clip from a ten-minute recording taken from an altitude of 450m. The operator had flown it to photograph a sunset, but had also recorded several airliners flying past. The model used was a DJI Mavic and the manufacturer strongly condemned the incident.

France
February 2016 A UAV came within 5m of an Air France A320 flight from Barcelona to Charles de Gaulle Airport. The aircraft was at an altitude of 1600m when the pilot saw the UAV to the planes' port, disengaged the autopilot and took evasive action. The Bureau d'Enquêtes et d'Analyses pour la Sécurité de l'Aviation Civile has initiated the first French inquiry into a near miss involving a UAV.

New Zealand
March 2018 A UAV came within 5m of an Air New Zealand Boeing 777-200 on final approach to Auckland Airport on 25 March 2018. The pilots spotted the UAV as the aircraft was at a point in its descent where it was not possible to take evasive action and they initially feared it would be sucked into an engine. Flight NZ92, which flew from Tokyo to Auckland, was unharmed. The identity of the UAV controller is unknown. Air New Zealand called for tougher laws to prevent reckless use of UAVs near airports and prison terms for operators who endanger lives. Under current laws operators who breach civil aviation rules can be fined up to NZ$5000.

Poland
21 July 2015 A Lufthansa plane landing at Warsaw Chopin Airport nearly collided with a drone. The drone came in within 100 m of the plane, at an altitude of 760 m, 5 km away from the airport, near Piaseczno.

United Kingdom 

October 2014It was reported that a UAV had flown within 25 metres of an ATR 72 passenger airliner on 30 May 2014. The aircraft was approaching London Southend Airport and about to intercept the ILS glide slope when the copilot reported seeing a small craft flying about 100 m to the right of the aircraft. The copilot and Air Traffic Controller agreed it was probably a quadcopter – it was seen flying as close as 25 m to the aircraft. Southend ATC couldn't detect the craft on radar – subsequent examination of radar from other sites produced several brief but inconclusive radar signals. Police were contacted, but the operator of the UAV could not be found.
December 2014Investigators confirmed that they were investigating claims that a UAV came about 20 feet of an Airbus A320 landing at Heathrow on 22 July. The A320 was 700 feet from landing when the craft passed 20 feet over the left wing of the aircraft – they did not collide. Despite an investigation and cooperation of remote-control model aircraft club members, the operator of the aircraft could not be identified. The incident was given an A rating, meaning that there had been a serious risk of collision.
April 2015A Westland Lynx flying over Hambrook had to take evasive action to avoid a UAV that passed one rotor span from the side of the helicopter.
June 2015An autogyro flying over Detling, Kent encountered a UAV at an altitude of 450 metres. The UAV was 20m from the autogyro and the pilot considered the risk of collision high.
July 2015Both crew members of an RJ1 saw a UAV at an altitude of 1200m over Detling, Kent. As it would not be visible from the ground, the United Kingdom Airprox Board concluded that it was impossible for it to be flown legally under those circumstances.
July 2015A BE200 aircraft approaching Southampton Airport when a UAV passed within two wing lengths of it. Investigators concluded that chance played a large role in the vehicles not colliding.
July 2015A Dornier 328 was on final approach to Manchester Airport at 850m when a blue UAV was spotted. Investigators concluded that the UAV was not permitted to be in that space.
September 2015A Boeing 737 had a near miss shortly after takeoff from London Stansted Airport, leaving the pilot no time to react.
September 2015A UAV came within 20m of an Embraer 170 over the Houses of Parliament as the latter aircraft was on approach to London City Airport.
September 2015Shortly after a Boeing 777 had taken off from Heathrow Airport, a UAV passed within 25 metres of the jet at the same height.
September 2015An Airbus A319 was landing at Heathrow Airport at 150m when a UAV was seen about 23m to the left and 6m above the airliner.
October 2015A Dornier 328 was taking off from Manchester Airport when a UAV passed 15m from the left wing tip when the latter was at 900m, leading the pilot to conclude there was a high risk of collision.
October 2015A Piper PA-28 Cherokee was flying near Otherton Airfield, Staffordshire, when a UAV passed about 6m from the wing tip.
March 2016BALPA called for tests to determine the possible outcomes of UAVs colliding with passenger aircraft.
August 2016 An East Anglian Air Ambulance Eurocopter EC145 narrowly avoided a collision with a drone over north London at 7:45PM on August 26. The drone passed within 30m of the air ambulance and was seen by the crew. Investigators found there was a high risk of the helicopter and UAV coming into contact, endangering the helicopter. The UAV was also being operated over a built-up area without Civil Aerial Authority permission and the incident was classed in the highest risk category, A. Prince William regularly flies the helicopter but was not on duty at the time of the incident.
November 2016 An EasyJet aircraft landing at Edinburgh Airport narrowly avoided colliding with a UAV flying at the same altitude by 23m. The Airprox Board said a collision had only been avoided "by providence".
May 2017 A Loganair flight descending into Edinburgh Airport had to take evasive action when the crew saw a UAV about 20-30m from the aircraft at an altitude of 4,000 feet. The flight from Shetland landed safely. Police believe the UAV was operated from Bathgate or Armadale.

3 July 2017 Gatwick Airport closed its runway because of a UAV flying nearby. The runway was closed for one period of nine minutes, then another of five minutes. EasyJet said four of its flights were diverted and British Airways said one of its flights had been diverted to Bournemouth. Sussex Police are investigating.

9 July 2017 An Airbus 319 was preparing to land when a UAV appeared and flew over the aircraft's starboard wing. The UAV was initially thought to be a bird, appearing as a small dark object due to twilight conditions at 20:35 BST. At the closest point of approach, the drone appeared between the wing tip and fuselage, above the starboard wing. The aircraft landed safely and Gatwick Airport police were involved. A UK Airprox Board report into the incident said there was a high risk of collision and that "A larger aircraft might not have missed it and in the captain's opinion, it had put 130 lives at risk.". The report also said the UAV was "very large, certainly not a toy", had four blades and estimated that the drone was about three metres across. The report said that the estimated distance and pilots' inability to avoid the UAV "portrayed a situation where providence had played a major part" in avoiding an accident. Former pilot Stephen Landells said it was a "worrying near-miss that could have ended in tragedy". Mr Landells also said that BALPA wanted to see details of proposed legislation for drone registration and a timeline for said registration.

United States
March 2013An Alitalia pilot on final approach to runway 31 right at John F. Kennedy International Airport reported seeing a small UAV near his aircraft. Both the FAA and FBI were reported to be investigating.

22 March 2014US Airways Flight 4650 nearly collided with a drone while landing at Tallahassee Regional Airport. The plane, a Bombardier CRJ200, was at an altitude of  when it came dangerously close to the drone, described by one of the pilots "as a camouflaged F-4 fixed-wing aircraft that was quite small". Jim Williams, head of the UAV office at the Federal Aviation Administration, said: "The risk for a small [drone] to be ingested into a passenger airline engine is very real." The Federal Bureau of Investigation was investigating the incident, which was the first known instance of a large airliner nearly colliding with a drone in the U.S.  However, the authenticity of this report is under dispute.

5 December 2015A California Highway Patrol helicopter in Martinez, California was working with local police when they spotted the lights of a UAV. They were flying between seven and eight hundred feet and the UAV was about the same height. The helicopter banked to evade it, but the UAV passed by it. The helicopter followed the UAV to where it landed and called local police to find the operator. The CHP asked UAV operators to be careful about flying. The incident has been passed to the Federal Aviation Administration for investigation. According to the operator of the UAV, it was flying on autopilot because of a lost radio signal. The operator was cooperating with FAA, police and Caltrans and has offered an apology to the helicopter pilot.

March 2016 A Lufthansa Airbus A380 reported a near miss as it approached Los Angeles International Airport. The airliner was at an elevation of 5000 feet and about 14 miles east of the airport when the UAV flew 200 feet over it. Police searched for the UAV pilot, though they admitted the search would be a long shot.

2018 A video posted to YouTube featured footage filmed by a drone hovering above an approaching Frontier Airlines Airbus A320. The airport was identified as McCarran International Airport and the UAV may have taken off from a parking lot near Whitney Mesa Nature Preserve to the east of the airport. Both The Academy of Model Aeronautics and Association for Unmanned Vehicle Systems International condemned the video. The Federal Aviation Administration is investigating the incident.

Accidents and incidents

UAVs have historically had a much higher loss rate than manned military aircraft. In addition to anti-aircraft weapons, UAVs are vulnerable to power and communications link losses.

Australia

October 2013A UAV crash landed onto train tracks on the Sydney Harbour Bridge, where it was found and retrieved by a Sydney Trains conductor. Confused platform workers inspected the UAV, with concern that it may have been a weapon. The Civil Aviation Safety Authority (CASA) started an investigation, and the police began searching for the pilot. The pilot was testing new UAV equipment when the camera mounting failed in mid-flight, and the UAV began to return to its GPS starting point. The UAV collided with the corner of a building and then a Sydney Harbour Bridge pylon, and the pilot presumed it to have been lost to the waters of Port Jackson. After seeing media stories of a "mystery drone" colliding with the nearby bridge, the pilot contacted aviation authorities and Sydney police. The police found the situation to be unsuspicious and returned the craft to the pilot.

April 2014A triathlete was injured in an incident involving a drone that was filming a race. She claimed that the drone collided with her and said "the ambulance crew took a piece of propeller from my head". The owner of the UAV claimed that the athlete had been injured when she was frightened by the falling UAV and tripped. Timing equipment caused interference with the operation of the UAV while it was close to people on the ground. In November 2014, the Commonwealth Director of Public Prosecutions stated that the evidence showed that the drone had crashed into the triathlete who sustained head injuries as a result. However taking into account the young age and antecedents of the drone operator the Commonwealth Director of Public Prosecutions chose not to proceed with a charge against the operator and handed the matter back to CASA. CASA subsequently fined the operator $1,700 for flying the drone within 30 metres of people.

February 2016A recreational drone pilot crashed their drone, a DJI Phantom, during a ceremony at the Australian War Memorial in Canberra. No one was injured. The drone reportedly landed near the Memorial's Director, and former defence minister, Brendan Nelson, who picked it up and subsequently handed it to security staff. Following a Civil Aviation and Safety Authority (CASA) investigation the drone pilot was fined $900, which according to a CASA spokesman, closed the matter.

Canada
June 2016Stephanie Creignou was attending a 5K run in Beloeil, Quebec when a DJI Phantom 3 fell and hit her on the head. She was taken to hospital where she was diagnosed with whiplash. As of 22 June she was still out of work and had had to cancel a holiday with her husband. Rosaire Turcotte, who operated the UAV that crashed, said he couldn't understand how it happened and that he'd acted safely. The incident was caught by a camera on a different UAV, one owned by VTOL-X drones, who had been hired to cover the event. Flavio Martenkowski, CEO of VTOL-X, said he's spoken to Turcotte about the danger of flying so near to a crowd just before the crash. The Transportation Safety Board of Canada has opened an investigation into the crash.

France
October 2013A tourist was arrested in Paris and fined 400 euro for "operating an aircraft non-compliant with safety laws".

October and November 2014Unidentified UAVs were seen flying near 13 nuclear power plants. The Secretariat-General for National Defence and Security issued a statement that the flights were an "organized provocation".

March 2016A UAV with a wingspan of 3m went out of control and was pursued by two Belgian F-16 fighter aircraft. When it flew into French airspace it was pursued by French Rafale fighters for two hours until it crashed in a field near Dizy-le-Gros. It had been built by the Flemish Institute for Technological Research and had taken off from Weelde Air Base.

India
May 2014 Francescos' Pizza of Mumbai made a test delivery from a branch in Lower Parel to the roof of a building in Worli. Police in Mumbai began an investigation on the grounds that security clearances had not been sought.

Republic of Ireland
2012A theatre group flew Parrot AR.Drones in Dublin to film video for an exhibit. The Irish Aviation Authority stated that this was prohibited as Dublin city is classed as a restricted area.

April 2014 A video of Cork taken by Raymond Fogarty became popular online, but was criticised by licensed operators SkyTec. Fogarty later became a commercial UAV pilot and urged UAV operators to be aware of laws and not fly over build up areas.

Italy
December 2015A UAV filming a slalom event in Madonna di Campiglio nearly hit Marcel Hirscher. The International Ski Federation had agreed to the use of the UAV, though the pilot was not allowed to fly directly over the race course. The race director said that the pilot had not followed the federations' instructions. Camera UAVs have since been banned from the federations' World Cup races.

South Africa
June 2013Police officers apprehended a man who flew a multicopter outside the hospital that Nelson Mandela was in. The equipment and footage were confiscated by the police.

April 2016A UAV hit and broke an office window in Cape Town and collided with David Perel, an interface designer and racing driver for Kessel Ferrari. The operator and a friend went to check that he hadn't been injured and Perel returned the UAV. The SACAA contacted both Perel and the operators after video of the incident appeared on YouTube.

United Kingdom
April 2014A man pleaded guilty to flying a small UAV within 50 m of a submarine testing facility. He claimed that he had been flying a mile from the base but had lost radio contact with the craft. He was fined £800 and ordered to pay legal costs of £3,500. The CAA claimed that the case raised safety issues related to flying unmanned aircraft.

September 2015Nigel Wilson, of Bingham, Nottinghamshire, admitted nine breaches of the Air Navigation Order the previous year. He was fined £1,800 and banned from buying or using a UAV for two years.

November 2015It was reported that a toddler had lost an eye as a result of an accident with a UAV. Simon Evans flew the UAV which accidentally struck a tree and started spinning before it struck Oscar Webb. Oscar can see out of his uninjured eye, but will require several operations before fitting a prosthetic eye. Oscar's family have forgiven Evans, but he hasn't flown any of his UAVs since, saying that when he looks at his UAVs since the incident he feels "physically sick".

December 2015Lincolnshire Police asked the operator of a UAV to come forward after footage taken by it flying over Lincoln appeared on YouTube. The flight was criticised by an expert as "incredibly irresponsible".

March 2016A UAV collided with a train hauled by the Flying Scotsman steam locomotive. British Transport Police opened an investigation, having identified the operator, and warned UAV operators not to fly within 50 metres of a train as it is illegal.

July 2016Daniel Kelly, from Grove Park, Lewisham, London pleaded guilty to using a UAV to send a psychoactive substance and tobacco into HMP Swaleside. He was arrested on 25 April 2016 in Leysdown-on-Sea. Police had spotted a vehicle with the lights on,then someone ran to it and it sped off. A UAV was found in the boot of the car – it had been sprayed with black paint and black tape had been put over the lights. Kent Police said it was probably the first UK conviction of its type. His girlfriend was cleared of the same charges. He had also flown over HMP Elmley, HMP Wandsworth and HM Prison The Mount.

3 July 2017The runway at Gatwick Airport was closed for two short periods because of a drone incursion.

19-21 December 2018A suspected UAV of "industrial specifications" caused major air traffic disruption for over 100,000 passengers on 700 flights at Gatwick Airport during the busy Christmas period. Repeated reported sightings of a UAV over the runway caused a suspension of all takeoffs and landings starting at 9:03 PM on 19 December. Each time Gatwick prepared to reopen its runway, further reported sightings forced its closure. The distruption continued for approximately 45 hours, with the last reported sighting of a UAV occurring at 5:10pm on 21 December. Two people were arrested in connection with the incident but were released without charge. Despite an 18-month investigation and a £50,000 reward for information, no culprit or evidence of drone use was ever found. There are no known photographs, videos, or official descriptions of the alleged UAV, leading a number of experts to suggest that there was no UAV involved in the disruption.

31 December 2018A man was arrested after allegedly flying a drone from the Severn Bridge.

8 January 2019 Flights were suspended at the UK's busiest airport, Heathrow, after a drone sighting was reported.

22 January 2022 The Premier League game between Brentford and Wolverhampton Wanderers was halted for 20 minutes by a drone flying over the pitch at the Community Stadium.

United States 
August 1956 Several Northrop F-89 Scorpions attempted to shoot down a runaway F6F-5K drone in Southern California, failing to bring it down with rocket fire. It crashed in a desert area.
August 2013A UAV filming events at the Virginia Bull Run in Dinwiddie County, Virginia crashed into the crowd, causing minor injuries.

May 2014Police were called to Hammonasset Beach State Park, Madison, Connecticut by Andrea Mears who claimed that Austin Haughwout had been filming people at a beach and that he had filmed people with his UAV and that he had assaulted her. The police prepared to arrest him, but he produced recordings from his UAV and mobile phone which showed that he hadn't been filming people and that Mears had assaulted him instead. Mears was arrested and charged with assault in the 3rd degree and breach of peace in the 2nd degree. She was granted Accelerated Probation which erases her conviction from her record after two years.

June 2014Ice hockey fans were celebrating a victory outside the Staples Center, Los Angeles, in 2014 when a UAV was seen flying over the crowd. The crowd threw objects at the UAV, bringing it close enough to the ground for members of the crowd to grab it. Claims were made that the UAV belonged to the Los Angeles Police Department, but the LAPD denied this.

January 2015A DJI Phantom crashed in the grounds of the White House, Washington, D.C. The operator had flown it while drunk and lost control of it.

June 2015A woman watching the Seattle Pride parade was hit by a falling UAV and knocked unconscious, suffering a concussion. She was standing near Fourth Avenue and Madison Street when the drone collided with a building, fell and struck her on the head. Her boyfriend caught her when she fell and an off-duty firefighter helped. Police investigated and the pilot came forward. In January 2017 Paul M. Skinner was found guilty of reckless endangerment by a six-person jury in a unanimous verdict before Judge Willie Gregory. It was the first time the Seattle Public Attorneys' office had convicted anyone of mishandling a drone in a public place. Such a conviction can carry a penalty of up to 364 days in jail and a $5000 fine. Mr. Skinner is scheduled to be sentenced in February 2017.

July 2015Firefighting aircraft were grounded for 26 minutes in Southern California because of fears of collisions with five UAVs that had been seen in the area. It was the fourth time in as many weeks that drones had hampered firefighters in Southern California.

August 2015A police search in east Hollywood was interrupted by a UAV. Police had been searching for a man wanted for assault with a deadly weapon when a UAV flew near a Los Angeles Police Department helicopter. In November 2015 Martin Sheldon pleaded no contest to obstructing a police officer on 27 August 2015 when he flew his UAV near the helicopter. He had to surrender his UAV to police, complete 30 days of community labor and promise not to own or fly a UAV or other unmanned aircraft during his three years of probation.

September 2015A drone crashed into empty seating at the US Open at Louis Armstrong Stadium, Queens, New York causing no injuries according to the USTA. It happened during a match between Flavia Pennetta and Monica Niculescu. A teacher named Daniel Verley was arrested on charges of reckless endangerment, reckless operation of a drone and operating a drone outside of a prescribed area in a New York city park. He was released and ordered to attend court at a later date. It is expressly forbidden to bring drones onto the grounds of the National Tennis Center. In October 2015 Daniel Verley was sentenced to community service, involving tutoring disenfranchised students. He had cooperated fully with the investigation.

October 2015A drone collided with power lines in West Hollywood, causing a power cut to 700 Southern California Edison customers.

December 2015A man in Lockport, New York was charged with trespassing after he allegedly flew a UAV near the Van De Mark chemical plant, which produces phosgene gas.

December 2016A drone flying near the Space Needle, Seattle, Washington collided with the tower while pyrotechnicians were setting up fireworks for New Year.

February 2017 A UAV flew into the window of a 27th storey apartment in Kips Bay, Manhattan, breaking it while the occupant was at home.

May 2017 A UAV filming the Golden State Race Series in California collided with a tree, and spun out of control into a group of cyclists. Part of the drone lodged in the front wheel of a cyclist, causing him to flip over his handlebars and suffer abrasions. The drone operator reportedly offered to buy the cyclist a new front wheel and helmet.

May 2017 A track and field meeting at Trabuco Hills High School, Mission Viejo, California was targeted by a drone dropping water balloons on the event, though only one person was hit. The drone had been spotted the previous evening and the sports coach had sent people out to find the drone operators. Police were notified the following morning.

May 2017 A GoPro Karma hit a seat at Petco Park, San Diego, California narrowly missing fans during a match between the San Diego Padres and the Arizona Diamondbacks. Major League Baseball said that UAVs are not allowed at baseball grounds.

September 2017 A 52-year-old woman saw a UAV flying outside the 42nd floor of a condominium tower in the 500 block of North Lake Shore Drive, Chicago around 12:30pm on 9 September 2017. According to police, it hovered for a long time near the building, without the consent of building management. Amit Kleiman, aged 31, attempted to retrieve the UAV from the third floor and was taken into custody. He was charged with one count each of criminal trespass, reckless conduct and breach of the peace.

December 2019 – January 2020A large group of unidentified drones was repeatedly observed in Colorado and Nebraska flying in grid formations at night. The drones were apparently being operated in violation of federal regulations, prompting investigations by the FAA and the state of Colorado.

July 2020 A man was arrested on federal charges in Portland, Oregon for flying a drone in restricted air space during a protest

See also
UAVs in the U.S. military
Use of UAVs by the CIA

References

+
Wireless
Avionics
Robotics
Emerging technologies
Aviation-related lists
Lists of accidents and incidents involving military aircraft